Milenko Milošević (born 13 November 1976) is a retired Bosnian footballer and football manager. He usually fielded as a defensive midfielder, although Milo was also able to play as central defender.

Club career

FR Yugoslav First League
Born in Zvornik, SR Bosnia and Herzegovina, Milenko Milošević played his early career in Serbia with FK Loznica from where he moved to Red Star Belgrade.  After playing in Belgrade two seasons, he moved to another First League of FR Yugoslavia side, FK Sutjeska Nikšić.

Career in Belgium
Searching for a defensive midfielder, Belgian First division side Excelsior Mouscron offered Milošević a trial in 2003. During this trial however, Mouscron signed Algerian international Samir Beloufa for the position of defensive midfielder, making it no longer useful for Mouscron to sign Milosevic. Georges Leekens, the Mouscron coach at that time, recommended Milošević to his former team Cercle Brugge, who had just promoted and were interested in any improvement for the squad. Milošević signed a contract a little later.

His contract with Cercle ended in 2008 and was not renewed. He signed for West Flanders Division One side Blue Star Poperinge, where he met his former Cercle manager Jerko Tipurić. Poperinge became champions and will play in the lowest nationwide league next season.

International career
Milošević has also played once for the senior national team of Bosnia and Herzegovina, winning 1–2 in a match against Luxembourg in 2004. He came on as a second-half substitute for Muhamed Konjić.

Managerial career
By early 2011, after Drina Zvornik manager Darko Vojvodić resigned, Milošević along with Svetozar Vukašinović took charge of the team in their Bosnian Premier League match against Olimpik and stayed as the club's dual managers until Dragan Mićić got appointed on 25 March 2011.

Managerial statistics

References

External links

 Milenko Milošević player info at the official Cercle Brugge site 
 Cerclemuseum.be 

1976 births
Living people
People from Zvornik
Serbs of Bosnia and Herzegovina
Association football midfielders
Bosnia and Herzegovina footballers
Bosnia and Herzegovina international footballers
Red Star Belgrade footballers
FK Loznica players
FK Mogren players
FK Sutjeska Nikšić players
Cercle Brugge K.S.V. players
K.V. Oostende players
FK Drina Zvornik players
First League of Serbia and Montenegro players
Second League of Serbia and Montenegro players
Belgian Pro League players
Challenger Pro League players
First League of the Republika Srpska players
Bosnia and Herzegovina expatriate footballers
Expatriate footballers in Serbia and Montenegro
Bosnia and Herzegovina expatriate sportspeople in Serbia and Montenegro
Expatriate footballers in Belgium
Bosnia and Herzegovina expatriate sportspeople in Belgium
Bosnia and Herzegovina football managers
FK Drina Zvornik managers
Premier League of Bosnia and Herzegovina managers